For the Rest of His Life (Russian: На всю оставшуюся жизнь, Na vsyu ostavshuyusya zhizn) was a  Soviet TV mini-series, Great Patriotic war drama, adaptation of The Train (Sputniki) novel by Vera Panova.

Plot
Story about the life of doctors, nurses and other personnel of a hospital train during the Great Patriotic War.

Cast
 Alexey Eybozhenko as Commissar Danilov
  as Hospital train Commander Doctor Belov
 Lyudmila Arinina as Julia Dmitrievna
  as Nikonov
 Yevgeny Solyakov as Danya
 Maya Bulgakova as Dusya
  as intendant Sobol
 Valentin Gaft as Lt. Kramin
Kira Golovko as Sonechka
  as Doctor Suprugov
 Mikhail Zhigalov as one-legged Captain
  as Nizvetsky
 Valery Zolotukhin as Sasha
  as Lena Ogorodnikova
  as Nurse Faina
  as Sukhoyedov
 Gleb Strizhenov as Kravtsov
 Margarita Terekhova as Faina and one-legged pregnant woman
 Nina Urgant as Aunt Laundry
  as Goremykin

Awards
 1976 —  Tbilisi TV Movie Festival Award

References

External links

Russian television miniseries
1975 in the Soviet Union
1970s war drama films
1970s television miniseries
1970s Russian-language films
Soviet World War II films
Medical-themed films
Films based on Russian novels
1970s Soviet television series
1975 films
Eastern Front of World War II films
World War II television series